Nicklas Strunck Jakobsen (born 17 August 1999) is a Danish professional footballer who plays as a midfielder for Esbjerg fB.

Youth career
Strunck started his career with Ølstykke, but after being demoted to the second team, his father, Kenn Strunck Jakobsen, decided to transfer him to Stenløse BK, where he himself had once played on the first team as a senior. Strunck played for Stenløse in two years, before joining Frederikssund, where he also played for two years. As an under-15 player, he joined FC Nordsjælland. He won the U17 Talent of the Year award in 2016 by the Danish Football Association in 2016.

Club career

Nordsjælland
Strunck got his first senior call up on 11 February 2018, where he sat on the bench for the whole game against SønderjyskE in the Danish Superliga. He made his debut for FC Nordsjælland only five days later at the age of 18. Strunck started on the bench, but replaced Mikkel Damsgaard in the 91st minute in a 2–1 victory against OB.

Strunck was officially promoted the first team squad for the 2018–19 season. Strunck signed a contract extension in July 2018 until 2021.

Groningen
On 11 August 2019, Strunck was signed by Dutch Eredivisie club FC Groningen for a reported fee of around €500,000. He moved to Groningen on a four-year contract.

Esbjerg
After no appearances for Groningen, Strunck was sent on a one-season loan to Danish 1st Division club Esbjerg fB on 5 October 2020 for the 2020–21 season.

On 4 June 2021 Esbjerg confirmed, that Strunck had signed a permanent deal with the club until June 2025. On 11 July, he was appointed team captain of the club, before controversial manager Peter Hyballa gave the captain's armband to 19-year-old Mads Larsen on 24 July.

References

External links
 
 Nicklas Strunck Jakobsen at DBU 

1999 births
Living people
Danish men's footballers
Danish expatriate men's footballers
Association football forwards
Danish Superliga players
Eredivisie players
Danish 1st Division players
Danish 2nd Division players
FC Nordsjælland players
FC Groningen players
Esbjerg fB players
Denmark youth international footballers
People from Egedal Municipality
Danish expatriate sportspeople in the Netherlands
Expatriate footballers in the Netherlands
Sportspeople from the Capital Region of Denmark